Everything is the third studio album by American pop rock band the Bangles. It was released on October 18, 1988 through Columbia Records.

Just like its predecessor, Everything produced a US Top 5 hit ("In Your Room"), and a number one single, "Eternal Flame," which became a chart-topper in almost every major country around the world.

The 2008 reissue CD on the Wounded Birds label (WOU 4056) adds a bonus track: "In Your Room" (12" Remix). Two songs that were recorded for the album but not included were "What I Meant to Say", written by the Peterson sisters and sung by Debbi, which was released as the B-side of "Eternal Flame", as well as "Everything I Wanted", co-written and sung by Susanna Hoffs and released in 1990 on Greatest Hits.

Everything was the Bangles' last album before their nine-year hiatus from 1989 to 1998.

Track listing

Personnel
The Bangles
 Susanna Hoffs – lead and backing vocals, guitars, percussion
 Vicki Peterson – lead and backing vocals, lead and rhythm guitars, mandolin
 Michael Steele – bass, lead and backing vocals, guitars, percussion
 Debbi Peterson – drums, percussion, lead and  backing vocals
Additional musicians
 Darryl Citizen – "noise"
 Paulinho da Costa – percussion
 Bobby Donati – guitar on "Some Dreams Come True"
 Vinnie Vincent – 12-string guitar on "Make a Play for Her Now"
 Tommy Morgan – harmonica
 Jim Snodgrass – tabla
 David Lindley – classical guitar, bouzouki, saz, dobro
 John Philip Shenale – keyboards, programming
 Walker Igleheart – keyboards, programming
 David White – keyboards, programming
 William Jones – sitar (uncredited)

Production
 Producer – Davitt Sigerson
 A&R – Ron Oberman
 Engineer – John Beverly Jones
 Additional Recording – Ken Felton
 Assistant Engineers – Ken Felton and Joe Schiff
 Recorded at Ocean Way Recording and Studio 55 (Los Angeles, CA).
 Mixed by Frank Filipetti at Studio 55.
 Mastered by Doug Sax at The Mastering Lab (Los Angeles, CA).
 Art Direction – Nancy Donald and Tony Lane
 Artwork – Lesley Schiff
 Logo Design – David Coleman
 Photography – Sheila Rock
 Management – Miles Copeland III, Ian Lloyd-Bisley and Pamela Turbov at Firstars, Inc.

Charts

Weekly charts

Year-end charts

Certifications

References

External links
 The Bangles official website

1988 albums
Columbia Records albums
The Bangles albums
Albums produced by Davitt Sigerson